Peter Hambleton (born 1960) is a New Zealand stage, film and television actor, and stage director. Hambleton graduated from Toi Whakaari: New Zealand Drama School in 1982 with a Diploma in Acting. In 2002 Hambleton was a New Zealand Shakespeare’s Globe International Actors’ Fellow.  Well known in the Wellington theatre scene, he has played ornithologist Walter Buller in the 2006 play Dr Buller's Birds and Charles Darwin in the 2009 play Collapsing Creation. He played the Dwarf Glóin in The Hobbit film series and Mike Johnson in an episode of the 1999 TV miniseries A Twist in the Tale. He has also featured in television advertisements, including as the businessman in the Ansett New Zealand "Fluffy" advertisement.

Filmography

Films

References

External links
 

New Zealand male stage actors
New Zealand male film actors
New Zealand male television actors
Living people
1960 births
21st-century New Zealand male actors
Toi Whakaari alumni